Ithania is a genus of parasitic alveolates of the phylum Apicomplexa.

This genus was described in 1947 by Ludwig.

Description
This genus has only a single recognised species - Ithania wenrichi. This species infects the larvae of the crane fly (Tipula abdominali).

References

Conoidasida
Parasites of Diptera
Species described in 1947